During the Second World War, the Romanian Army possessed around 200 armored cars. These ranged from captured inoperable Soviet vehicles to modern German and Italian front line models, as well as internal security vehicles.

Conducător's security battalion
At the start of World War II, Romania owned a total of 19 armored cars. All were used by the security battalion of Conducător Ion Antonescu. Six of these vehicles dated from World War I (two French Peugeot Armored Cars and four Russian Austin-Putilovs). The remaining thirteen were modern Czechoslovak vehicles which escaped from Ruthenia in early 1939, namely ten Tatra armored cars and three produced by Škoda.

Marshal Antonescu himself used a bulletproof Mercedes-Benz 770 W150, a gift from Adolf Hitler.

Front line vehicles
The first front line combat armored cars were acquired in late 1942-early 1943. They comprised 11 Leichter Panzerspähwagens (six Sd. Kfz. 222 and five Sd. Kfz. 223). A much more significant delivery came in August 1943, when the Germans transferred 40 Sd. Kfz. 222 along with 8 Italian-built AB 41s. In 1941, Romania built one armored car prototype armed with one Czechoslovak-made 37 mm gun.

Captured vehicles
By October 1941, 103 Soviet armored cars were captured by the Romanian Army. Most of these vehicles, however, were not serviceable. The captured Soviet armored cars (or at least the ones which could be made serviceable) were of the BA-10 type. More Soviet vehicles were captured later, as evidenced by the presence of the BA-64 within the Romanian Army's ranks (this model started production only in 1942).

List

References 

World War II armoured fighting vehicles of Romania